Mosdenia is a genus of African plants in the grass family. The only known species is Mosdenia leptostachys, native to Angola and Limpopo.

References

Chloridoideae
Monotypic Poaceae genera
Flora of Southern Africa